"I'll Be Waiting" is the first single by punk rock band the Offspring released in 1986. A re-recorded version of the song appeared as the tenth track on their self-titled debut album, which was released three years later. It was the band's first official release and is the only single issued by the band with original drummer James Lilja.

Versions
Several versions of "I'll Be Waiting" were released. One was released in 1986 as a 7" single, with "Blackball" as the b-side, and was the band's first official release. This single was reissued in 1994, following the Offspring's commercial success with their third studio album Smash. A demo version of "I'll Be Waiting" (then-known as "Fire and Ice") was recorded for the band's demo 6 Songs earlier in July 1986. That version can be heard on the long-out of print Subject to Blackout compilation tape, which was also released in 1986 (this version is also available for free to download from the European Offspring website).

After James Lilja left the band, drumming duties were left to Ron Welty, who assisted the band in re-recording both tracks featured on the single for the Offspring's debut self-titled album which was released in 1989 (and re-released in 1995). "Blackball" and "I'll Be Waiting" were both produced by Thom Wilson.

The re-recording of "Blackball" (the B-side of the single) from the band's self-titled LP was featured in the video game Tony Hawk's Pro Skater 4.

Cover
The band members are depicted as shadows on the "I'll Be Waiting" single's cover in black and white, behind the Offspring logo. On their self-titled LP's insert and back cover, as well as on the 1995 reissue of the same album, the same cover can be found.

Track listing

Release
The band itself released "I'll Be Waiting" on Black Label Records (which the band named after a brand of beer), as a 7" vinyl record. Only 1000 copies of this record were made.

Personnel
Dexter Holland (credited as B. Holland) – Vocals
Noodles (credited as Child C-2017) – Guitar
Greg K. (credited as Greggor) – Bass
James Lilja (credited as James Frederick Lilja) – Drums

References

The Offspring songs
1986 debut singles
Songs written by Dexter Holland
Hardcore punk songs